Hamtramck is a city in Wayne County in the U.S. state of Michigan. As of the 2020 census, the city population was 28,433. Hamtramck is surrounded by the city of Detroit except for a small portion that borders the fellow enclave city of Highland Park. Hamtramck is by far the most densely populated municipality in the state of Michigan, and the only Muslim-majority town in the United States.

Known in the 20th century as a vibrant center of Polish-American life and culture, Hamtramck has attracted new immigrants in the 21st century, especially from Yemen, Bangladesh and Pakistan. In 2013, it reportedly became the first Muslim-majority city in the U.S. In 2015, Hamtramck became the first city to have a Muslim-majority city council in the history of the United States, with four of the six council members being Muslim.  In November 2021, Hamtramck elected a completely Muslim-American city council and a Muslim mayor, becoming the first municipality in the United States to be governed entirely by Muslim-Americans.

Name
Hamtramck is named for the French-Canadian soldier Jean François Hamtramck, who was the first American commander of Fort Shelby, the fortification at Detroit.  It was originally known as Hamtramck Township.

History
Hamtramck was originally settled by German farmers, but Polish immigrants moved into the area when the Dodge Brothers plant opened in 1914.  Poles previously made up a large proportion of the population. It is sometimes confused with Poletown, a traditional Polish neighborhood, which used to lie mostly in the city of Detroit and includes a small part of Hamtramck. As of the 2010 American Community Survey, 14.5% of Hamtramck's population is of Polish origin whereas in 1970 it was 90% Polish.

Over the past thirty years, a large number of immigrants from the Middle East (especially Yemen), India, Pakistan, Bangladesh and Nepal, and Southeastern Europe (especially Bosnia and Herzegovina) have moved to the city. As of the 2010 American Community Survey, the city's foreign born population stood at 41.1%, making it Michigan's most internationally diverse city (see more at Demographics below). The population was 43,355 in the 1950 Census and 18,372 in 1990.

Hamtramck was primarily farmland, although the Detroit Stove Works employed 1,300 workers to manufacture stoves. In 1901, part of the township incorporated as a village to gain more control over the settlement's affairs, and by 1922 the village was reincorporated as a city to fend off annexation attempts by the neighboring city of Detroit. By the mid-1920s, 78% of the residents of Hamtramck owned their own houses or were buying their houses. Around that time, the factory workers made up 85% of Hamtramck's heads of households. Of those factory workers, about 50% were categorized as not skilled workers. In 1910, the newly founded Dodge Main assembly plant created jobs for thousands of workers and led to additional millions of dollars in the city. Dodge Main quickly expanded and became important to Hamtramck. Before the construction of Dodge Main, Hamtramck was a largely rural town. The establishment of the Dodge Main assembly plant led to a large influx of Polish immigrants who pushed out the incumbent German politicians. It was after this that Hamtramck was considered a Polish-American town.

By the end of the 20th century and the closing of Dodge Main, followed closely by General Motors razing of key parts of the Polish neighborhoods, the ethnicity of the region quickly shifted from traditionally Polish descendants to new Middle Eastern and Indian, Pakistani, Bangladeshi and Nepali immigrants. By the elections of 2015, the city is said to have been the first to elect a Muslim-majority council in the country.

Geography 

Hamtramck is mostly surrounded by Detroit except for its small common border with the city of Highland Park, which is in turn mostly surrounded by Detroit. The I-75 freeway roughly runs along this city's western border and I-94 runs near its southern border.

Culture 
Hamtramck flourished from 1910 to 1920 as thousands of European immigrants, particularly Poles, were attracted by the growing automobile industry. The city has grown increasingly ethnically diverse but still bears many reminders of its Polish ancestry in family names, street names and businesses. A recent survey found 26 native languages spoken by Hamtramck schoolchildren. The city's motto was "A League of Nations". Neal Rubin of The Detroit News wrote in 2010 that despite the demographic changes, "In a lot of ways, Hamtramck still feels like a Polish enclave."

In 1987, Detroit television station WDIV ran one episode of a local sit-com called Hamtramck which featured former Detroit Tigers pitcher Dave Rozema and a cameo by manager Sparky Anderson. It was met with poor reviews and protests by many Polish Americans, and was canceled before airing a second episode.

At the time of the 2000 census, Hamtramck was again experiencing considerable growth, with over 8,000 households and a population of almost 23,000.

The  Hamtramck Historical Museum and the Polish Art Center are next door to one another.

In 1997, the Utne Reader named Hamtramck one of "the 15 hippest neighborhoods in the U.S. and Canada" in part for its punk and alternative music scene, its Buddhist temple, its cultural diversity, and its laid-back blue-collar neighborhoods. In May 2003, Maxim Blender selected Hamtramck as the second "Most Rock N' Roll City" in the U.S., behind Williamsburg in Brooklyn, New York City. Hamtramck is home of several of Michigan's most distinguished music venues.

In January 2004, members of the Al-Islah Islamic Center requested permission to use loudspeakers for the purpose of broadcasting the Islamic call to prayer. This request set off a contentious debate in the city, about the noise that would be caused by the call to prayer, eventually garnering national attention. Ultimately Hamtramck amended its noise ordinance in July 2004, allowing for the prayer calls to be made.

Hamtramck Disneyland is an art installation in the city built on two garages out of metal.

Hamtramck festivals

Pączki Day 
Polish immigrants and residents of Hamtramck and southeastern Michigan celebrate Tłusty Wtorek (Fat Tuesday), known locally as Pączki Day, by lining up at the city's numerous Polish bakeries to purchase pączki. On Pączki Day, several local bars host parties with live entertainment and free pączki.

Hamtramck Music Festival 
The "Hamtramck Music Festival" is an annual Independent music festival held in March in Hamtramck. It is currently sponsored by Bens Encore and the local Artist Community. In 2011, almost 200 bands played the Blowout at 14 venues over four days.

St. Florian Strawberry Festival 
Held annually in the first weekend in May at grounds at St. Florian Church.

Hamtramck Labor Day Festival 
The Hamtramck Labor Day Festival is held on Labor Day weekend, ending with the Polish Day Parade on Labor Day. The festival includes live music on two stages, a carnival area, beer, and food tents extending the half-mile (1 km) stretch of Joseph Campau Street, from Caniff to Carpenter.

Planet Ant Film & Video Festival in Hamtramck 
Held at the Planet Ant Theater, the festival celebrates independent movies and the people who make them, featuring comedies, dramas, documentaries, animation and music videos.

Economy 
General Motors' Detroit/Hamtramck Assembly plant, one of the automaker's premiere facilities, produced the Chevrolet Volt, the Cadillac CT6, the Chevrolet Impala and the Buick Lacrosse; it was closed in March 2019, and retooled as Factory ZERO for 2021 Hummer EV by GMC.

In April 2009, American Axle announced that it planned to close its plant at the Hamtramck/Detroit border, thus eliminating several hundred jobs in the area. As of February 2014, most of the 1.9 million-square-foot former facility has been demolished.

The Polish Art Center, at 9539 Joseph Campau Street, is a local institution in Hamtramck. The center promotes the preservation of Polish heritage through its display of cultural artifacts, often exhibited at festivals, schools and libraries. The center also hosts lectures, book signings, workshops, folk-art demonstrations, and pisanki-making classes.

The Ukrainian American Archives & Museum of Detroit is located at 9630 Joseph Campau Ave. It was formerly at 11756 Charest Street. The Museum's purpose is "to educate and inform the general public about the culture, art, and history of Ukrainians, their immigration to the United States and the contributions of Americans of Ukrainian descent to America; to engage in research in these areas; to maintain archives for the deposit of documents and other records relating to these topics; to acquire, preserve, exhibit artifacts of artistic, historical, and scientific value relating to these subjects; to sponsor public programs in order to study and preserve the heritage of Ukrainian Americans."

For more than 85 years, Kowalski Sausage Co. has manufactured meat products at 2270 Holbrook Street, which are distributed in the metropolitan Detroit area.

Notwithstanding the statement in the credits that it was filmed "in Detroit, Michigan", the 1998 Indie film Polish Wedding was filmed mainly in Hamtramck, particularly at a house on Wyandotte Street. Theresa Connelly, who wrote and directed the film, had spent her childhood in Hamtramck.

In December 2010, citing general budget woes and the city of Detroit withholding a portion of shared revenue for the Detroit/Hamtramck Assembly plant straddling the border of both cities, Hamtramck requested that the State of Michigan allow it to declare bankruptcy. The request was denied. Receivership was avoided when a deal was struck between the city and Detroit which required Detroit to pay $3.2 million in collected taxes to Hamtramck in exchange for Hamtramck paying Detroit nearly the same amount for a water and sewage bill that was in arrears.

The United States Postal Service operates the Hamtramck Post Office at 2933 Caniff Street. The post office annex is located at 14600 Dequindre Street in the City of Detroit.

Sports 

Hamtramck is home to Detroit City FC (DCFC) a professional American soccer club that plays in United Soccer League Championship (USLC), the second tier of the American Soccer Pyramid. The club plays their home matches at Keyworth Stadium, which is owned by Hamtramck Public Schools. The club is managed by Trevor James, a former Ipswich Town F.C. player who later was an assistant coach and scout under Bobby Robson.

Demographics

2020 census
As of the census of 2020, there were 28,433 people residing in the city. There were 8,139 occupied housing units. The racial makeup of the city was 55.9% White (people of European, Middle Eastern and North African descent), 10.0% African American, 0.1% Native American, 26.9% Asian, 1.0% from other races, and 6.0% from two or more races. Hispanic or Latino residents, of any race, were 1.1% of the population.

2010 census
As of the census of 2010, there were 22,423 people, 8,897 households, and 5,115 families residing in the city. The racial makeup of the city was 53.5% White, 19.2% African American, 0.2% Native American, 21.5% Asian, 0.6% from other races, and 4.7% from two or more races. Hispanic or Latino of any race were 1.4% of the population.

There were 7,063 households, of which 43.2% had children under the age of 18 living with them, 40.3% were married couples living together, 18.1% had a female householder with no husband present, 7.0% had a male householder with no wife present, and 34.7% were non-families. 28.9% of all households were made up of individuals, and 9.2% had someone living alone who was 65 years of age or older. The average household size was 3.09 and the average family size was 3.98.

The median age in the city was 28.8 years. 31.7% of residents were under the age of 18; 12.2% were between the ages of 18 and 24; 27.9% were from 25 to 44; 20.7% were from 45 to 64; and 7.7% were 65 years of age or older. The gender makeup of the city was 51.6% male and 48.4% female.

2000 census
As of the census of 2000, there were 22,976 people, 8,033 households, and 4,851 families residing in the city. The racial makeup of the city was 60.96% White (which includes people of Middle Eastern ancestry), 15.12% African American, 0.43% Native American, 10.37% Asian, 0.10% Pacific Islander, 1.14% from other races, and 11.89% from two or more races. Hispanic or Latino of any race were 1.31% of the population.

In the 2000 census, major ancestry groups reported by Hamtramck residents were as follows:
 Bangladeshi 19.7%
 Pakistani 11.0%
 Polish 10.9%
 Arab (excluding Iraqi and Lebanese)  9.2%
 Macedonian 5.5%
 Asian Indian 5.4%
 Black or African American 5.1%
 Ukrainian 3.2%
 Albanian 2.8%
 Irish 2.2%
 German 1.9%
 Italian 1.8%
 Russian 1.4%
 English 1.1%
 French (excluding the Basques) 0.8%
 Lebanese 0.7%
 Scottish 0.7%
 Iraqi 0.5%
 Yugoslav 0.5%
 Mexican 0.2%

3.1% of Hamtramck's population reported Albanian ancestry. This made it the second most Albanian place in the United States by percentage of the population, second only to Fairview, North Carolina.

There were 8,033 households, out of which 33.3% had children under the age of 18 living with them, 37.3% were married couples living together, 16.1% had a female householder with no husband present, and 39.6% were non-families. 32.2% of all households were made up of individuals, and 13.3% had someone living alone who was 65 years of age or older. The average household size was 2.74 and the average family size was 3.59.

In the city, the population was spread out, with 27.8% under the age of 18, 10.8% 18 through 24, 31.9% 25 through 44, 17.7% 45 through 64, and 11.9% who were 65 years of age or older. The median age was 32 years. For every 100 females, there were 110.4 males. For every 100 females age 18 and over, there were 109.6 males.

The median income for a household in the city was $26,616, and the median income for a family was $30,496. Males had a median income of $29,368 versus $22,346 for females. The per capita income for the city was $12,691. About 24.1% of families and 27.0% of the population were below the poverty line, including 36.9% of those under age 18 and 18.1% of those age 65 or over.

From the 1990 census to the 2000 census, the city's population increased by 25%. Sally Howell, author of "Competing for Muslims: New Strategies for Urban Renewal in Detroit", wrote that this was "overwhelmingly" due to immigration from majority Muslim countries.

From 1990 to 2000, of all of the municipalities in Wayne, Oakland, and Macomb counties, Hamtramck had the highest percentage growth in the Asian population. It had 222 Asians according to the 1990 U.S. Census and 2,382 according to the 2000 U.S. Census, an increase of 973%.

Ethnic groups

Historically, Hamtramck received a lot of immigration from Eastern Europe. In the 20th century, Hamtramck was mostly Polish. George Tysh of the Metro Times stated that "In the early days of the auto industry, Hamtramck's population swelled with Poles, so much so that you were more likely to hear Polish spoken on Joseph Campau than any other tongue." Later waves of immigration brought Albanians, Bosnians, Macedonians, Ukrainians, and Yemenis. By 2001 many Bangladeshis, Bosnians, and Iraqi Chaldeans were moving to Hamtramck. As of 2011 almost one in five Hamtramck residents was Asian (excluding those from South-west Asia). As of 2003, over 30 languages are spoken in Hamtramck and more than four religions are present.  The four principal religions are, Islam, Christianity, Hinduism and Buddhism.

In June 2013, the city's Human Relations Commission facilitated the raising of flags of 18 countries from which Hamtramck residents emigrated. They are displayed on Joseph Campau Street, with an American flag flying at either end.

Bangladeshi-Bengali people 

In the 1930s, the first group of Bangladeshi-Bengalis came to Detroit and Hamtramck. The first significant population of Bengalis began arriving in the late 1980s and the Bengalis became a large part of the city's population in the 1990s. The largest growth occurred in the 1990s and 2000s. By 2001 many Bangladeshi Americans had moved from New York City, particularly Astoria, Queens, to Hamtramck and the east side of Detroit. Many moved because of lower costs of living, larger amounts of space, work available in small factories, and the large Muslim community in Metro Detroit. Many Bangladeshi Americans moved into Queens, and then onwards to Metro Detroit.

In 2002, over 80% of the Bangladeshi population within Wayne, Oakland, and Macomb counties lived in Hamtramck and some surrounding neighborhoods in Detroit. That area overall had almost 1,500 ethnic Bangladeshis. Almost 75% of Bangladeshi Michiganders live in Hamtramck.

By 2002, a Bengali business district formed along Conant Avenue and some residents called it "Little Bengal". The district, along Caniff and Conant streets, included markets, stores, mosques, and bakeries owned by Bangladeshis, Indians, and Pakistanis. By 2008 the Bengali business district, between Davison and Harold Street, and partially within the city limits of Detroit, received the honorary title "Bangladesh Avenue" and was to be dedicated as such on November 8, 2008. Akikul H. Shamin, the president of the Bangladesh Association of Michigan, estimated that Bangladeshi people operate 80% of the buildings and businesses in the portion of Conant Avenue. As of February 2008 the city planned to erect signage reading "Bangladesh Town" in the business district.

In 2002, the estimate of Hamtramck inhabitants of origins from South Asia was from 7,000 to 10,000. As of 2001, 900 registered students who spoke Bengali and Urdu attended Hamtramck Public Schools.

As of 2014, there are over 13 Bengali clothing shops in the city.

Yemeni people 

As of 2006, most of the Middle Eastern population in Hamtramck is Yemeni. Hakim Almasmari wrote in 2006 that "Several streets seem to be populated exclusively by Yemeni Americans, and Yemeni culture pervades the city's social, business, and political life." Many Yemeni restaurants are in Hamtramck, and the Yemeni community operates the Mu'ath bin Jabal Mosque, which was established in 1976. In 2005 the mosque, located just outside the southeastern border of Hamtramck, was the largest mosque out of the ten within a three-mile radius. Sally Howell, author of "Competing for Muslims: New Strategies for Urban Renewal in Detroit", wrote that the mosque "has been credited" by public officials and area Muslims "with having turned around one of Detroit's roughest neighborhoods at the height of the crack cocaine epidemic of the 1980s, making its streets safe, revitalizing a dormant housing market, attracting new business to the area, and laying the foundation for an ethnically mixed, highly visible Muslim population in Detroit and Hamtramck."

According to Almasmari, some of the first Yemenis to have arrived in Hamtramck said that Yemeni people first arrived in Hamtramck in the 1960s. The "Building Islam in Detroit: Foundations/Forms/Futures" project of the University of Michigan stated that Yemenis began arriving in the 1970s.

The mural depicts a girl in a veil decorated with the blue sky, a farmer wearing a turban, and a woman in a hijab. The Arab American and Chaldean Council and the coalition OneHamtramck commissioned the mural.

Religious and political issues
In the 2000s a Bengali mosque named the Al-Islah Jamee Masjid wanted permission to broadcast the adhan, the Islamic call to prayer, from loudspeakers outside of the mosque and requested permission to do so from the city government. It was one of the newer mosques in Hamtramck. Sally Howell, author of "Competing for Muslims: New Strategies for Urban Renewal in Detroit", wrote that the request "brought to a head simmering Islamophobic sentiments" in Hamtramck. Muslims and interfaith activists supported the mosque. Some anti-Muslim activists, including some from other states including Kentucky and Ohio, participated in the controversy. Howell added that the controversy, through an "international media storm", gave "a cathartic test of the "freedoms" we were said to be "fighting for" in Afghanistan and Iraq" to the remainder of the United States. In 2004 the city council voted unanimously to allow mosques to broadcast the adhan on public streets, making it one of the few U.S. cities to allow this to occur. Some individuals had strongly objected to the allowing of the adhan, some continue to object. In 2015, some residents complained that they could hear the electronically amplified call to prayer inside their homes five times a day, with one of those daily times being at 6 A.M.

In 2023, the Hamtramck City Council approved animal slaughtering in households for Muslim religious purposes.

Government 

Hamtramck is governed under a council-manager form of government in which the elected mayor of the city is the chief executive officer. The city council consists of six seats. Though part of the council, the mayor is elected separately, and votes only in the case of a tie and on ordinances and contracts. The city council hires a city manager, who becomes the city's chief administrative officer. The city manager has the vested powers and responsibility to appoint and remove all city employees and department heads, prepare the city's budget, and other city functions.

The current Hamtramck City Hall is a former hospital building. In 1927 the Hamtramck Municipal Hospital, housed in a Georgian Revival building, opened. The Mayor of Hamtramck asked the Sisters of Saint Francis to operate the hospital. In 1931 the religious order began leasing the hospital from the city government for $1 per year. The hospital was renamed the Saint Francis Hospital. During its lifetime it offered services to Polish-speakers. In 1969 the hospital closed and the building became the city's city hall.

In November 2015, Hamtramck became the first American city to elect a Muslim-majority city council. In 2022 it became the first American city to have an all-Muslim government. The Wayne County Jail Division operates The William Dickerson Detention Facility in Hamtramck. The city levies a city income tax of 1 percent on residents and 0.5 percent on nonresidents.

Education

Public schools
Hamtramck is served by Hamtramck Public Schools. Hamtramck High School is the public high school of Hamtramck. In addition Hanley International Academy, Frontier International Academy, Hamtramck Academy, Bridge Academy (of the Global Educational Excellence (GEE) company), Caniff Liberty Academy and Oakland International Academy are all charter schools, in Hamtramck. Frontier International Academy, a charter school operated by GEE, is in nearby Detroit.

Private schools 
Hamtramck was historically a Polish Catholic community, so it housed Catholic schools by the Roman Catholic Archdiocese of Detroit. One of the buildings once used by Hanley charter school was previously St. Florian Elementary School. The other Catholic primary schools included Our Lady Queen of Apostles and St. Ladislaus Elementary School. The city also housed St. Florian High School, a Catholic high school which opened in 1940 and was located in another wing of the same building as St. Florian.

The parishes that established St. Florian, Our Lady Queen of Apostles, and St. Ladislaus had been built after 1909. In 1925 2,217 students attended St. Florian, making it the largest Catholic elementary school in the city. That year, St. Ladislaus had 1,540 students, Vinyard, p. 183.</ref> and Our Lady Queen of Apostles had 1,316 students. JoEllen McNergney Vinyard, author of For Faith and Fortune: The Education of Catholic Immigrants in Detroit, 1805-1925, wrote that the classrooms were "more crowded than most any Polish parish school in Detroit." In the Catholic schools in Hamtramck there were often 70 students per classroom compared to 45 students per classroom in Hamtramck public schools. It was common for children to attend religious schools selectively during certain periods so they could absorb religious ideals, but go to public school for preschool and later stages. In the 1920s Hamtramck had no Catholic high school and the majority of parents sent their children to public high school. Felician Academy and St. Josephat's Polish Catholic High School, two schools in Detroit, were located several blocks away from the Hamtramck border. Some parents sent their children to those schools.

In 1992 Dickinson West Elementary School opened in the former St. Ladislaus building. In the fall of 2002, St. Florian High and Bishop Gallagher High School in Harper Woods merged to form Trinity Catholic High School in Harper Woods. At that point, St. Florian Elementary remained open. In 2005 the archdiocese announced that St. Florian Elementary would close. After St. Florian Elementary's closing, no Catholic schools are located within the city limits of Hamtramck. During the same year, the archdiocese announced that Trinity High School would close.

History of education 

In the 1920s Hamtramck families often sent their children to public school for Kindergarten due to convenience, then moved their children to parochial schools during the periods with the most important religious instruction. Therefore, the age group 7 to 12 had the largest Catholic school enrollment. After the critical period ended, many students returned to public school. In 1925 the public schools had 1,467 students of ages 14–15 while the non-public schools had 217 students aged 14 and 15. In the early 1920s the annual growth rate of Hamtramck Public Schools buildings was 27% while non-public schools had an annual growth rate of 6% in that period.

In the 1920s there was a high level of school dropout in Hamtramck. During the decade Hamtramck had three 12th-grade students per 100 5th-grade students while the City of Detroit had 21 12th-grade students per 100 5th-grade students. In the 1920s 58% of 16-year-olds and 85% of 17-year-olds in Hamtramck were no longer attending high school. One public school survey stated that in 1924-1925 65% of male school dropouts began working in factories.

Public libraries

Hamtramck Public Library Albert J. Zak Memorial is located at 2360 Caniff. The Tau Beta Association founded the library in November 1918. The library opened at its second location, the second floor of a professional building, on November 14, 1938. In 1951 the City Hall branch opened in the first floor of the municipal building; it was dedicated on January 22, 1952. The current library received its groundbreaking ceremony on July 5, 1955. It was completed on May 31, 1956, and dedicated on July 1, 1956.

Timeline 

 1796: Colonel Jean François Hamtramck took possession of Detroit after British troops evacuated.
 1798: The Township of Hamtramck was established.
 1901: Hamtramck was established as a village.
 1908: Saint Florian Roman Catholic Church parish is the first Catholic church in Hamtramck.
 1910: Dodge Brothers Motor Car Company break ground for an automotive plant in Hamtramck; rapid influx of European immigrants begins.
 1914: Dodge Brothers plant begins operations.
 1922: Hamtramck is incorporated as a city to protect itself from annexation by Detroit; Peter C. Jezewski is the first mayor.
 1926: St. Florian's present edifice is built.  It has a 1928 Austin Organ Opus #1528 that contains 3 Manuals and 40 ranks, which was newly refurbished in 2008.
 : Won the Little League World Series of Baseball.
 1996: In November, voters pass the Ordinance to Preserve Parkland in Hamtramck  by a 64% vote, after a year-long campaign, marking the first time an ordinance was ever enacted in the City by a referendum vote of the population.
 2000: Hamtramck goes into Emergency Financial Status after running million dollar deficits and political in-fighting. Gov. Engler appoints Louis Schimmel as Emergency Financial Manager.
 2005: Hamtramck voters ratify a new City Charter
 2007: Hamtramck emerges from emergency financial management.
 2010: Hamtramck asked the state of Michigan permission to file for bankruptcy protection.
 2013: Hamtramck becomes the first Muslim-majority American city.
 2014: Hamtramck reenters emergency management.
 2015: Hamtramck becomes the first American city to elect a Muslim-majority city council.
 2018: The city is released from emergency management for the second time.
 2022: Hamtramck becomes the first American city with an all-Muslim government. 
 2023: Hamtramck City Council approves animal sacrifices for religious purposes.
In 1910 Hamtramck, then a village, had 3,559 residents. Between 1910 and 1920 Hamtramck's population grew by 1,266 percent. The growth of Hamtramck and neighboring Highland Park broke records for increases of population; both municipalities withstood annexation efforts from Detroit.

Notable people 
 Jane Bartkowicz, tennis player and girls single winner at The Championships, Wimbledon, was born in Hamtramck, and her skills were developed under the tutelage of the Hoxies.
 Albert M. Bielawski, Michigan State Representative, lived in Hamtramck.
 Mike Blyzka, Major League Baseball pitcher, born in Hamtramck.
 Matt Feazell, cartoonist.
 Bob Franke, singer-songwriter, born in Hamtramck.
 Steve Gromek, Major League Baseball pitcher, born in Hamtramck.
 John Hodiak (1914–1955), actor, raised in Hamtramck.
 Jean Hoxie, Hamtramck tennis player and coach inducted into the Michigan Sports Hall of Fame in 1965.
 Gail Kobe, actress, born and raised in Hamtramck.
 Truth Martini, pro wrestling manager for Ring of Honor.
 Warith Deen Mohammed (1933–2008), son of Elijah Muhammad, leader of American Society of Muslims, born in Hamtramck.
 Bill Nahorodny, Major League Baseball catcher.
 Lucien Nedzi, Former US Representative
 Tom Paciorek, Major League Baseball player, member of the 1961 Hamtramck team that won the Pony League World Series championship; Paciorek is enshrined into the National Polish-American Sports Hall of Fame.
 Wally Palmar (born Volodymyr Palamarchuk on April 27, 1954, in Hamtramck), singer for The Romantics.
 Mitch Ryder, singer, The Detroit Wheels, born in Hamtramck.
  Jeffrey Sinelli, restaurateur, founder of Genghis Grill and Which Wich?, lived in Hamtramck as a child.
 Kat Timpf, comedian, columnist, Fox News personality
 Rudy Tomjanovich, professional basketball player and coach of Croatian descent for the Houston Rockets, born in Hamtramck; member of the Michigan Sports Hall of Fame.
 Tom Tyler (1903–1954), actor, retired to and died in Hamtramck.
 Doug Wozniak, Michigan state representative
 Roger Zatkoff (1931-2021), NFL player for the Green Bay Packers and Detroit Lions.
 Bob Zurke (1912–1944), pianist, composer, arranger and bandleader
 Raymond Zussman (1917–1944), recipient of the Medal of Honor.
 Toi Derricotte, (born 1941), poet. Hamtramck.

See also 

 Islam in Metro Detroit

Notes

References
 
 {{cite book|last1=Howell|first1=Sally|title=Competing for Muslims: New Strategies for Urban Renewal in Detroit". Located in: Shryock, Andrew (editor). Islamophobia/Islamophilia: Beyond the Politics of Enemy and Friend|publisher=Indiana University Press |date=June 30, 2010|isbn=9780253004543}}
 
 

Further reading
 Farmer, Silas. (1884) (Jul 1969) The history of Detroit and Michigan, or, The metropolis illustrated: a chronological cyclopaedia of the past and present: including a full record of territorial days in Michigan, and the annuals of Wayne County, in various formats at Open Library.
 Kowalski, Greg. Hamtramck: The World War II Years. Arcadia Publishing, 2007. , .
 Kowalski, Greg, Hamtramck: The Driven City (Arcadia Publishing) 160 pages.   .
 Serafino, Frank, (1983) West of Warsaw.  Avenue Publishing Co.   .
 St. Florian Parish, Hamtramck, Michigan, 1908-1983 Published in 1985, s.n. (Hamtramck, Mich) (English and Polish) 400 p. Open Library.
 Wodka, Joseph. Some Correlates of Political Stability in a Polish-Language Voting Precinct in the Detroit Metropolitan Area; 1959 thesis.
 Hamtramck Consent Decree (Archive) - United States Department of Justice
 Davey, Monica. "Michigan Town Is Left Pleading for Bankruptcy." The New York Times. December 27, 2010.
 "Should Hamtramck Erect A 12-Foot Wall To Keep Out Detroiters?" (Archive) CBS Detroit July 19, 2013.
 Walker, Marlon A. "Possible fraud cited in Hamtramck primary, information sent to prosecutor's office." Detroit Free Press. September 9, 2013.
 Charles Sercombe: "Councilmember's open letter on city manager." The Hamtramck Review, December 30, 2015
 Larsen, Deborah J. (May/June 2021). "Michigan's Banglatown". Michigan History''. 105 (3). Lansing, Mich.: Historical Society of Michigan.

External links

 City of Hamtramck
 Hamtramck Chamber of Commerce
 

 
Cities in Wayne County, Michigan
Metro Detroit
Albanian-American culture in Michigan
Bengali-American culture
Islam in Metro Detroit
Polish-American culture in Metro Detroit
Populated places established in 1901
1901 establishments in Michigan